Molinara is a comune (municipality) in the Province of Benevento in the Italian region Campania, located about 80 km northeast of Naples and about 20 km northeast of Benevento.  

Molinara borders the following municipalities: Foiano di Val Fortore, San Giorgio La Molara, San Marco dei Cavoti.

References

External links
 Official website

Cities and towns in Campania